Maafushi (Dhivehi: މާފުށި) is one of the inhabited islands of Kaafu Atoll and the proposed capital for the Medhu Uthuru Province of the Maldives. It is noted for the Maafushi Prison. 

The island’s proximity to Malé and its transport hubs has allowed Maafushi to become a popular destination for tourists visiting local islands.

History
Maafushi was heavily damaged by the 2004 tsunami which impacted on over 100,000 of the Maldives 300,000 population.  The International Federation of Red Cross and Red Crescent Societies, supported by the Irish and American Red Cross Societies, began work on a mains sewage system on 10 August 2006. The International Federation has also funded the building of homes for those who lost theirs during the tsunami.

Geography

Demography

According to the latest Census conducted in 2014, the total population of Maafushi is at 2,692 out of which 2,340 are Maldivians, and 352 foreigners. There has been a 17% increase in the residing population of the Island since the previous Census which was done in 2006. The population of Maafushi represents 13.84% of the total locality (Kaafu Atoll).

Governance

In accordance with the recently passed Decentralization Act of Maldives, Maafushi is governed by an elected Island Council composed of five Councillors. The Council is headed by the President of the Council. The Island Council reports to the Local Government Authority (LGA). As democracy and decentralization is at the infant stage in Maldives, the councillors, and the government find it difficult to deal with important issues like land, and resource utilization. There are still many legal issues that need to be settled, before the island council can confidently perform its duties independently. There is also the issue of lack of know-how among the councillors. Most councillors are without basic education, and find it difficult to manage the day-to-day affairs of the island.

Economy
Tourists from neighboring resort islands also visit Maafushi for island hopping and Maafushi provides them with shopping opportunity with souvenir shops at assigned areas of the island.

Tourism

Guest houses

As of August 2016 there were more than 55 guest houses in Maafushi and it is the only local inhabited island with most number of guest houses and guest beds in the country.

Evolution of guest houses in Maafushi
 18/12/2017 December: 72 Guest houses
 09/2016 August: 55 guest houses 
 12/2015 December: 40 guest houses

Transport 
Maafushi is connected by ferry service from Malé.

References

Islands of the Maldives